Sabrina Sojourner (born October 23, 1952) was the District of Columbia's Shadow Representative for the at-large district from January 1997 until 1999. Serving as the third individual in the position, preceded by John Capozzi. She served a single term as Shadow Representative, not seeking reelection in 1999. Sojourner is a member of the Democratic Party.

Unlike the non-voting delegate seat, held by representative Eleanor Holmes Norton, the position was created on behalf of the District of Columbia's government and thus is not recognized by the United States Congress. Sojourner was elected to the seat in 1997 at 83% of the vote.

Political History
Prior to her election as D.C. Shadow Representative Sojourner formerly served as an aide to Congresswoman Maxine Waters. Sojourner had also held leadership positions within the National Organization for Women, serving as a lobbyist promoting women's issues.

Sojourner's congressional history primarily focused on gay and lesbian participation in the military, substance abuse, civil rights, police brutality, education, and domestic violence. She also focused on HIV/AIDS support for affected individuals in the D.C area. Sojourner's main duty as D.C.'s sole Shadow Representative was to lobby congress in passing full federal representation for the District, citing the Tennessee Plan as evidence to elevate the status of D.C.'s citizens.

Personal life
Sojourner is an open member of the LGBT community, who came out in 1976. Previously married when she was 18, and having a single son, Sojourner was subject to physical abuse by her former husband before they separated two years later. She currently lives with her domestic partner Letitia Gomez. Sojourner also served as an author and poet, writing a poetry collection titled Psychic Scars and Other Mad Thoughts.

Electoral history

See also
 Shadow congressperson
 Political party strength in Washington, D.C.

References

1952 births
Living people
20th-century American politicians
20th-century American women politicians
African-American women in politics
Lesbian politicians
LGBT African Americans
United States shadow representatives from the District of Columbia
Washington, D.C., Democrats
20th-century African-American women
20th-century African-American politicians
21st-century African-American people
21st-century African-American women
20th-century LGBT people